1 Chronicles 2 is the second chapter of the Books of Chronicles in the Hebrew Bible or the First Book of Chronicles in the Old Testament of the Christian Bible. The book is compiled from older sources by an unknown person or group, designated by modern scholars as "the Chronicler", and had the final shape established in late fifth or fourth century BCE. This chapter and two subsequent ones focus on the descendants of Judah, where chapter 2 deals with the tribe of Judah in general, chapter 3 lists the sons of David in particular and chapter 4 concerns the remaining families in the tribe of Judah and the tribe of Simeon. These chapters belong to the section focusing on the list of genealogies from Adam to the lists of the people returning from exile in Babylon (1 Chronicles 1:1 to 9:34).

Text
This chapter was originally written in the Hebrew language. It is divided into 55 verses.

Textual witnesses
Some early manuscripts containing the text of this chapter in Hebrew are of the Masoretic Text tradition, which includes the Aleppo Codex (10th century), and Codex Leningradensis (1008).

There is also a translation into Koine Greek known as the Septuagint, made in the last few centuries BCE. Extant ancient manuscripts of the Septuagint version include Codex Vaticanus (B; B; 4th century) and Codex Alexandrinus (A; A; 5th century).

Old Testament references
: 
: ; 
: ; 
: ; 
: ; 
: 
: 
: 
: ;

Structure
Verses 1–2 are part of the introduction to establish 'Israel's worldwide context' by listing the ancestors from Adam to Israel's twelve sons (1 Chronicles 1:1–2:2).

The remaining verses belong to an arrangement comprising 1 Chronicles 2:3–8:40 with the king-producing tribes of Judah (David;
2:3–4:43) and Benjamin (Saul; 8:1–40) bracketing the series of lists as the priestly tribe of Levi (6:1–81) anchors the center, in the following order:
A David’s royal tribe of Judah (2:3–4:43)
B Northern tribes east of Jordan (5:1–26)
X The priestly tribe of Levi (6:1–81)
B' Northern tribes west of Jordan (7:1–40)
A' Saul’s royal tribe of Benjamin (8:1–40)

Another concentric arrangement focuses on David's royal tribe of Judah (2:3–4:23), centering on the family of Hezron, Judah's grandson, through his three sons: Jerahmeel, Ram, and Chelubai (Caleb), as follows:

A Descendants of Judah: Er, Onan, and Shelah (2:3–8)
B Descendants of Ram up to David (2:9–17)
C Descendants of Caleb (2:18–24)
D Descendants of Jerahmeel (2:25–33)
D' Descendants of Jerahmeel (2:34–41)
C' Descendants of Caleb (2:42–55)
B' Descendants of Ram following David [David’s descendants] (3:1–24)
A' Descendants of Shelah, Judah s only surviving son (4:21–23)

The family of Israel (2:1–2)

 These are the sons of Israel; Reuben, Simeon, Levi, and Judah, Issachar, and Zebulun,
 Dan, Joseph, and Benjamin, Naphtali, Gad, and Asher.
"Israel": is "Jacob".
 the six sons of Leah;
 Dan, the son of Rachel's handmaid; 
 the sons of Rachel; 
 the remaining sons of the handmaids. 
Dan is placed before the sons of Rachel (cf. ) perhaps in reference to Rachel's wishing that the son of her maid Bilhah to be accounted her own. The subsequent parts mention every tribe with the exception of Zebulun and Dan, without any explanation of the omission. Nonetheless, Zebulun is mentioned in the Levitical town lists and in some narratives, whereas Dan is mentioned in Chronicles only in three places.

From Judah to David (2:3–17)
The family of Judah has the largest genealogy among the tribes of Israel, about 100 verses in 3 chapters, with the house of David as the main focus. Verses 3–5 are related mainly to Genesis 38, as well as to Genesis 46:12 and Numbers 26:19–22, whereas verse 5 is also tied to Ruth 4:18. The list of Hezron's descendants started in verse 9 with the emphasis on the family of Ram ben Hezron down to David and his siblings (verse 17). Verses 10–12 contain the line from Ram to Jesse, whose seven sons are listed in verses 13–17, and the last of these is David, as the climax of the chapter.  These verses (including verse 9) are linked to Ruth 4:19–22 (cf. 1 Samuel 16:6–10; 17:13). David was the seventh son in verse 15, whereas 1 Samuel 16:10–11; 17:12 assumes eight sons of Jesse. Nethaneel, Raddai, and Ozem are not mentioned in other texts. David's sisters are mentioned in verses 16–17 (cf. 2 Samuel 17:25).

Verse 7
And the sons of Carmi; Achar, the troubler of Israel, who transgressed in the thing accursed.
Cross reference: Joshua 7:1

The extended family of Hezron ben Perez (2:18–24)

Verse 20
And Hur begot Uri, and Uri begot Bezalel.
"Bezalel": the chief builder of the Tabernacle.

The family of Jerahmeel ben Hezron (2:25–41)
Verses 34–35 display special attitude of the Chronicler towards foreigners: because Sheshan had no sons, his line would continue through his daughters and an Egyptian servant.

The family of Caleb ben Hezron (2:42–55)
The other descendants of Caleb are enumerated in 1 Chronicles 2:42-49, of which the two latter, 1 Chronicles 2:46-55, are the descendants from his concubines.

Verse 42
Now the sons of Caleb the brother of Jerahmeel were Mesha his firstborn, which was the father of Ziph; and the sons of Mareshah the father of Hebron.
"Caleb brother of Jerahmeel": is the same person as "Caleb son of Hezron" (1 Chronicles 2:18) and "Chelubai" (1 Chronicles 2:9).

See also

Related Bible parts: Genesis 29, Genesis 35, Genesis 38, Genesis 46, Exodus 31, Exodus 35, Numbers 26, Joshua 7, Ruth 4, 1 Samuel 16, 1 Samuel 17, Matthew 1, Luke 3

Notes

References

Sources

External links
 Jewish translations:
 Divrei Hayamim I - I Chronicles - Chapter 2 (Judaica Press) translation [with Rashi's commentary] at Chabad.org
 Christian translations:
 Online Bible at GospelHall.org (ESV, KJV, Darby, American Standard Version, Bible in Basic English)
 First Book of Chronicles Chapter 2. Bible Gateway

02